Craigavon Borough Council was a local council in counties Armagh, Down and Antrim, in Northern Ireland. It merged with Armagh City and District Council and Banbridge District Council in May 2015 under local government reorganisation in Northern Ireland to become Armagh, Banbridge and Craigavon District Council.

The headquarters of the council were in Craigavon, on the shores of Lough Neagh, a new town built between Lurgan and Portadown. The council area included the large towns of Lurgan and Portadown, as well as smaller ones including Waringstown and Donaghcloney. The average council budget of £15.5 million provided a wide range of services to the 93,023 people living in the area.

The council area consisted of four electoral areas – Central, Loughside, Lurgan and Portadown – in which 26 councillors were elected every four years. The council held an annual meeting in June, at which a new Mayor and Deputy Mayor were elected.  Parties elected in 2011, the last elections for the council, were Democratic Unionist Party (DUP) nine seats, Sinn Féin eight, Ulster Unionist Party (UUP) six, Social Democratic and Labour Party (SDLP) four, and Alliance Party of Northern Ireland one.

The last election was due to take place in May 2009, but on 25 April 2008, Shaun Woodward, Secretary of State for Northern Ireland announced that the scheduled 2009 district council elections were to be postponed until the introduction of the eleven new councils in 2011. The proposed reforms were abandoned in 2010, and the 2011 Northern Ireland local elections took place to fill the last body on the council before being dissolved The proposed reform took effect on 1 April 2015.

Together with part of the district of Banbridge, it was part of the Upper Bann constituency for elections to the Westminster Parliament and Northern Ireland Assembly.

Summary of seats won 1973–2011

Note: The Workers' Party were known as The Republican Clubs in 1977 and Workers Party Republican Clubs in 1981.

Source:

Mayor of Craigavon

Source: Freedom of Information request to Craigavon Borough Council

Final council makeup

Below is a list of members who made up the final sitting of the council before it was dissolved.

Council services
Coney Island, Lough Neagh is owned by the National Trust and was managed on their behalf by Craigavon Borough Council.

Population
The area covered by Craigavon Borough Council had a population of 93,023 residents according to the 2011 Northern Ireland census.

See also
 Local Councils in Northern Ireland

References

 
Politics of County Armagh
District councils of Northern Ireland, 1973–2015
Boroughs of Northern Ireland